Mark Hamilton Dekker (born 5 December 1969) is a Rhodesian born former Zimbabwean international cricketer. He played 14 Test matches and 23 One Day Internationals for Zimbabwe in the 1990s. In December 2018 Dekker was appointed to be the head coach of Kent Women in England before taking a coaching role with the Kent County Cricket Club Academy the following year.

Early life
Dekker was born at Gatooma in Mashonaland in what was then Rhodesia in 1969, his family having previously lived in South Africa. He grew up in Bulawayo and was educated at Christian Brothers College where he first played regular cricket. He played for the Zimbabwe under-15 team and for Zimbabwe schools.

Cricket career
After leaving school Dekker played in England for Central Lancashire Cricket League side Crompton Cricket Club in 1988 and 1989 and by 1990 was playing in Zimbabwe for Old Miltonians and Matabeleland before the province was given first-class cricket status. He played for Young Zimbabwe against Pakistan B in a match later given declared first-class and in other matches against other touring teams and "scoring plenty of runs in domestic cricket" as an opening batsman when he was "surprised" to be included for the Zimbabwe national team to play a One Day International (ODI) against New Zealand in October 1992.

A Test call up followed in December 1993 and Dekker went on to play 14 Test matches and 23 ODIs for Zimbabwe, his final international appearances coming at the end of 1996. He was the first batsman in Zimbabwe's history to carry his bat through a completed Test innings, scoring 68 not out against Pakistan at Rawalpindi in 1993.

After retirement Dekker coached cricket at Tonbridge School in Kent, England. In 2017 he was appointed as a Community Cricket Officer at Kent County Cricket Club and in December 2018 became the head coach of Kent Women. After leading the women's side to the Women's County Championship title in 2019, Dekker took up a coaching role with the Kent Academy, working alongside Head of Talent Pathway and former Second XI coach Min Patel.

References

External links

1969 births
Living people
Alumni of Christian Brothers College, Bulawayo
Matabeleland cricketers
Zimbabwe One Day International cricketers
Zimbabwe Test cricketers
Zimbabwean cricketers
Sportspeople from Kadoma, Zimbabwe
White Zimbabwean sportspeople